Varda may refer to:

People
Agnès Varda (1928–2019), French film director and professor
Jean Varda (1893–1971), Greek artist
Ratko Varda (born 1979), Bosnian basketball player
Rosalie Varda (born 1958), French costume designer, producer, writer and actress; daughter of Agnès

Fiction
Varda (Middle-earth), one of the Valar (powers) in J. R. R. Tolkien's legendarium.

Places
174567 Varda, a possible dwarf planet named after Tolkien's Varda
Mount Varda, a mountain in the Golan Heights
Varda, Greece, a town in Elis, Greece
Várda, a village in Somogy, Hungary
Varda, Slovenia, a settlement
Varda, Kosjerić, a village in Serbia
Varda Viaduct, a railway viaduct in southern Turkey

Other uses
Voice Activated Radio Dispatched Alarm, a type of alarm system

See also
Vardan, a name
Vardar (disambiguation)